The 1981–82 Pittsburgh Penguins season was their 15th in the National Hockey League. The qualified for the playoffs for the fourth straight year, but lost in the opening round to the eventual Stanley Cup champion New York Islanders three games to two. This would be the Penguins last playoff appearance until 1989.

Regular season

Final standings

Schedule and results

|- style="background:#fcf;"
| 1 || Oct 6 || Pittsburgh Penguins || 2–6 || St. Louis Blues || The Checkerdome || 0–1–0 || 0
|- style="background:#ffc;"
| 2 || Oct 7 || Pittsburgh Penguins || 5–5 || Chicago Black Hawks || Chicago Stadium || 0–1–1 || 1
|- style="background:#cfc;"
| 3 || Oct 10 || Quebec Nordiques || 1–2 || Pittsburgh Penguins || Civic Arena || 1–1–1 || 3
|- style="background:#fcf;"
| 4 || Oct 11 || Pittsburgh Penguins || 2–8 || Philadelphia Flyers || The Spectrum || 1–2–1 || 3
|- style="background:#fcf;"
| 5 || Oct 14 || New York Islanders || 4–1 || Pittsburgh Penguins || Civic Arena || 1–3–1 || 3
|- style="background:#cfc;"
| 6 || Oct 17 || Minnesota North Stars || 2–5 || Pittsburgh Penguins || Civic Arena || 2–3–1 || 5
|- style="background:#fcf;"
| 7 || Oct 18 || Pittsburgh Penguins || 2–3 || Detroit Red Wings || Joe Louis Arena || 2–4–1 || 5
|- style="background:#cfc;"
| 8 || Oct 20 || Colorado Rockies || 3–5 || Pittsburgh Penguins || Civic Arena || 3–4–1 || 7
|- style="background:#ffc;"
| 9 || Oct 22 || Pittsburgh Penguins || 3–3 || Calgary Flames || Stampede Corral || 3–4–2 || 8
|- style="background:#fcf;"
| 10 || Oct 23 || Pittsburgh Penguins || 3–8 || Edmonton Oilers || Northlands Coliseum || 3–5–2 || 8
|- style="background:#cfc;"
| 11 || Oct 25 || Pittsburgh Penguins || 6–4 || Vancouver Canucks || Pacific Coliseum || 4–5–2 || 10
|- style="background:#fcf;"
| 12 || Oct 28 || Toronto Maple Leafs || 5–3 || Pittsburgh Penguins || Civic Arena || 4–6–2 || 10
|- style="background:#fcf;"
| 13 || Oct 29 || Pittsburgh Penguins || 4–6 || Philadelphia Flyers || The Spectrum || 4–7–2 || 10
|- style="background:#cfc;"
| 14 || Oct 31 || Buffalo Sabres || 1–3 || Pittsburgh Penguins || Civic Arena || 5–7–2 || 12
|-

|- style="background:#cfc;"
| 15 || Nov 4 || New York Rangers || 3–6 || Pittsburgh Penguins || Civic Arena || 6–7–2 || 14
|- style="background:#cfc;"
| 16 || Nov 7 || Philadelphia Flyers || 2–7 || Pittsburgh Penguins || Civic Arena || 7–7–2 || 16
|- style="background:#cfc;"
| 17 || Nov 11 || Pittsburgh Penguins || 3–2 || Washington Capitals || Capital Centre || 8–7–2 || 18
|- style="background:#ffc;"
| 18 || Nov 14 || Pittsburgh Penguins || 3–3 || Boston Bruins || Boston Garden || 8–7–3 || 19
|- style="background:#cfc;"
| 19 || Nov 18 || St. Louis Blues || 1–6 || Pittsburgh Penguins || Civic Arena || 9–7–3 || 21
|- style="background:#ffc;"
| 20 || Nov 20 || Toronto Maple Leafs || 3–3 || Pittsburgh Penguins || Civic Arena || 9–7–4 || 22
|- style="background:#fcf;"
| 21 || Nov 21 || Pittsburgh Penguins || 5–9 || Montreal Canadiens || Montreal Forum || 9–8–4 || 22
|- style="background:#cfc;"
| 22 || Nov 24 || Pittsburgh Penguins || 7–1 || Quebec Nordiques || Quebec Coliseum || 10–8–4 || 24
|- style="background:#cfc;"
| 23 || Nov 25 || Montreal Canadiens || 1–2 || Pittsburgh Penguins || Civic Arena || 11–8–4 || 26
|- style="background:#cfc;"
| 24 || Nov 28 || Detroit Red Wings || 3–5 || Pittsburgh Penguins || Civic Arena || 12–8–4 || 28
|-

|- style="background:#cfc;"
| 25 || Dec 2 || Winnipeg Jets || 2–4 || Pittsburgh Penguins || Civic Arena || 13–8–4 || 30
|- style="background:#fcf;"
| 26 || Dec 5 || Pittsburgh Penguins || 1–3 || St. Louis Blues || The Checkerdome || 13–9–4 || 30
|- style="background:#fcf;"
| 27 || Dec 6 || Pittsburgh Penguins || 4–7 || Buffalo Sabres || Buffalo Memorial Auditorium || 13–10–4 || 30
|- style="background:#fcf;"
| 28 || Dec 9 || Philadelphia Flyers || 4–1 || Pittsburgh Penguins || Civic Arena || 13–11–4 || 30
|- style="background:#cfc;"
| 29 || Dec 12 || Washington Capitals || 4–7 || Pittsburgh Penguins || Civic Arena || 14–11–4 || 32
|- style="background:#fcf;"
| 30 || Dec 14 || Pittsburgh Penguins || 4–5 || New York Rangers || Madison Square Garden (IV) || 14–12–4 || 32
|- style="background:#cfc;"
| 31 || Dec 16 || Los Angeles Kings || 6–7 || Pittsburgh Penguins || Civic Arena || 15–12–4 || 34
|- style="background:#ffc;"
| 32 || Dec 19 || New York Rangers || 3–3 || Pittsburgh Penguins || Civic Arena || 15–12–5 || 35
|- style="background:#fcf;"
| 33 || Dec 20 || Pittsburgh Penguins || 1–3 || Philadelphia Flyers || The Spectrum || 15–13–5 || 35
|- style="background:#ffc;"
| 34 || Dec 23 || Pittsburgh Penguins || 4–4 || Toronto Maple Leafs || Maple Leaf Gardens || 15–13–6 || 36
|- style="background:#fcf;"
| 35 || Dec 26 || Buffalo Sabres || 7–5 || Pittsburgh Penguins || Civic Arena || 15–14–6 || 36
|- style="background:#fcf;"
| 36 || Dec 27 || Pittsburgh Penguins || 3–5 || New York Rangers || Madison Square Garden (IV) || 15–15–6 || 36
|- style="background:#cfc;"
| 37 || Dec 30 || Washington Capitals || 2–6 || Pittsburgh Penguins || Civic Arena || 16–15–6 || 38
|-

|- style="background:#cfc;"
| 38 || Jan 2 || Hartford Whalers || 4–9 || Pittsburgh Penguins || Civic Arena || 17–15–6 || 40
|- style="background:#cfc;"
| 39 || Jan 3 || Pittsburgh Penguins || 6–4 || Hartford Whalers || XL Center || 18–15–6 || 42
|- style="background:#fcf;"
| 40 || Jan 6 || Pittsburgh Penguins || 3–6 || Chicago Black Hawks || Chicago Stadium || 18–16–6 || 42
|- style="background:#fcf;"
| 41 || Jan 7 || Pittsburgh Penguins || 4–5 || Detroit Red Wings || Joe Louis Arena || 18–17–6 || 42
|- style="background:#cfc;"
| 42 || Jan 9 || Vancouver Canucks || 3–4 || Pittsburgh Penguins || Civic Arena || 19–17–6 || 44
|- style="background:#fcf;"
| 43 || Jan 13 || Pittsburgh Penguins || 1–6 || Winnipeg Jets || Winnipeg Arena || 19–18–6 || 44
|- style="background:#fcf;"
| 44 || Jan 16 || Pittsburgh Penguins || 0–4 || Calgary Flames || Stampede Corral || 19–19–6 || 44
|- style="background:#ffc;"
| 45 || Jan 17 || Pittsburgh Penguins || 3–3 || Vancouver Canucks || Pacific Coliseum || 19–19–7 || 45
|- style="background:#cfc;"
| 46 || Jan 20 || Boston Bruins || 4–5 || Pittsburgh Penguins || Civic Arena || 20–19–7 || 47
|- style="background:#fcf;"
| 47 || Jan 21 || Pittsburgh Penguins || 1–6 || New York Islanders || Nassau Veterans Memorial Coliseum || 20–20–7 || 47
|- style="background:#ffc;"
| 48 || Jan 23 || Philadelphia Flyers || 5–5 || Pittsburgh Penguins || Civic Arena || 20–20–8 || 48
|- style="background:#fcf;"
| 49 || Jan 26 || Pittsburgh Penguins || 2–9 || New York Islanders || Nassau Veterans Memorial Coliseum || 20–21–8 || 48
|- style="background:#fcf;"
| 50 || Jan 27 || New York Islanders || 6–3 || Pittsburgh Penguins || Civic Arena || 20–22–8 || 48
|- style="background:#cfc;"
| 51 || Jan 30 || Winnipeg Jets || 1–2 || Pittsburgh Penguins || Civic Arena || 21–22–8 || 50
|- style="background:#fcf;"
| 52 || Jan 31 || Pittsburgh Penguins || 3–8 || Washington Capitals || Capital Centre || 21–23–8 || 50
|-

|- style="background:#fcf;"
| 53 || Feb 3 || Minnesota North Stars || 9–6 || Pittsburgh Penguins || Civic Arena || 21–24–8 || 50
|- style="background:#fcf;"
| 54 || Feb 6 || Washington Capitals || 6–4 || Pittsburgh Penguins || Civic Arena || 21–25–8 || 50
|- style="background:#fcf;"
| 55 || Feb 7 || Pittsburgh Penguins || 4–5 || Philadelphia Flyers || The Spectrum || 21–26–8 || 50
|- style="background:#ffc;"
| 56 || Feb 10 || Hartford Whalers || 3–3 || Pittsburgh Penguins || Civic Arena || 21–26–9 || 51
|- style="background:#fcf;"
| 57 || Feb 11 || Pittsburgh Penguins || 2–4 || Montreal Canadiens || Montreal Forum || 21–27–9 || 51
|- style="background:#ffc;"
| 58 || Feb 13 || Los Angeles Kings || 3–3 || Pittsburgh Penguins || Civic Arena || 21–27–10 || 52
|- style="background:#fcf;"
| 59 || Feb 16 || Pittsburgh Penguins || 2–6 || New York Islanders || Nassau Veterans Memorial Coliseum || 21–28–10 || 52
|- style="background:#fcf;"
| 60 || Feb 17 || New York Rangers || 5–3 || Pittsburgh Penguins || Civic Arena || 21–29–10 || 52
|- style="background:#cfc;"
| 61 || Feb 20 || Philadelphia Flyers || 5–6 || Pittsburgh Penguins || Civic Arena || 22–29–10 || 54
|- style="background:#cfc;"
| 62 || Feb 21 || New York Islanders || 3–4 || Pittsburgh Penguins || Civic Arena || 23–29–10 || 56
|- style="background:#fcf;"
| 63 || Feb 25 || Pittsburgh Penguins || 2–4 || New York Islanders || Nassau Veterans Memorial Coliseum || 23–30–10 || 56
|- style="background:#fcf;"
| 64 || Feb 27 || Edmonton Oilers || 4–1 || Pittsburgh Penguins || Civic Arena || 23–31–10 || 56
|- style="background:#cfc;"
| 65 || Feb 28 || Pittsburgh Penguins || 4–2 || New York Rangers || Madison Square Garden (IV) || 24–31–10 || 58
|-

|- style="background:#fcf;"
| 66 || Mar 3 || Boston Bruins || 3–2 || Pittsburgh Penguins || Civic Arena || 24–32–10 || 58
|- style="background:#cfc;"
| 67 || Mar 6 || Pittsburgh Penguins || 6–4 || Quebec Nordiques || Quebec Coliseum || 25–32–10 || 60
|- style="background:#ffc;"
| 68 || Mar 7 || Calgary Flames || 4–4 || Pittsburgh Penguins || Civic Arena || 25–32–11 || 61
|- style="background:#cfc;"
| 69 || Mar 10 || Pittsburgh Penguins || 7–2 || Washington Capitals || Capital Centre || 26–32–11 || 63
|- style="background:#cfc;"
| 70 || Mar 13 || Colorado Rockies || 2–6 || Pittsburgh Penguins || Civic Arena || 27–32–11 || 65
|- style="background:#fcf;"
| 71 || Mar 15 || Pittsburgh Penguins || 3–4 || Minnesota North Stars || Met Center || 27–33–11 || 65
|- style="background:#fcf;"
| 72 || Mar 17 || Pittsburgh Penguins || 4–10 || Edmonton Oilers || Northlands Coliseum || 27–34–11 || 65
|- style="background:#fcf;"
| 73 || Mar 20 || Pittsburgh Penguins || 5–7 || Los Angeles Kings || The Forum || 27–35–11 || 65
|- style="background:#cfc;"
| 74 || Mar 21 || Pittsburgh Penguins || 6–0 || Colorado Rockies || McNichols Sports Arena || 28–35–11 || 67
|- style="background:#fcf;"
| 75 || Mar 24 || New York Rangers || 7–2 || Pittsburgh Penguins || Civic Arena || 28–36–11 || 67
|- style="background:#ffc;"
| 76 || Mar 27 || Chicago Black Hawks || 3–3 || Pittsburgh Penguins || Civic Arena || 28–36–12 || 68
|- style="background:#cfc;"
| 77 || Mar 28 || Pittsburgh Penguins || 6–5 || Washington Capitals || Capital Centre || 29–36–12 || 70
|- style="background:#ffc;"
| 78 || Mar 31 || Washington Capitals || 4–4 || Pittsburgh Penguins || Civic Arena || 29–36–13 || 71
|-

|- style="background:#cfc;"
| 79 || Apr 2 || Pittsburgh Penguins || 7–5 || New York Rangers || Madison Square Garden (IV) || 30–36–13 || 73
|- style="background:#cfc;"
| 80 || Apr 4 || New York Islanders || 2–7 || Pittsburgh Penguins || Civic Arena || 31–36–13 || 75
|-

|- style="text-align:center;"
| Legend:       = Win       = Loss       = Tie

Playoffs
The Penguins lost in the division semi-final round (3-2) versus the New York Islanders.

Player statistics
Skaters

Goaltenders

†Denotes player spent time with another team before joining the Penguins.  Stats reflect time with the Penguins only.
‡Denotes player was traded mid-season.  Stats reflect time with the Penguins only.

Awards and records
 Paul Baxter became the first Penguins player to receive 400 penalty minutes in a season. He did so in a 7–2 loss to New York on April 4th, finishing the season with 409 PIMs.
 Mike Bullard established a new franchise rookie record for goals with 36. He topped the previous high of 31 held by Pierre Larouche.
 Ron Stackhouse established a franchise record for goals (66), assists (277) and points (343) by a defenseman. He had led in all categories since the mid-1970s.

Transactions

The Penguins were involved in the following transactions during the 1981–82 season:

Trades

Additions and subtractions

Draft picks 

The 1981 NHL Entry Draft was held on June 10, 1981 in Montreal, Quebec.

References
 Penguins on Hockey Database

Pittsburgh Penguins seasons
Pittsburgh
Pittsburgh
Pitts Pennsylvania
Pittsburgh Penguins